Abū Bakr al-Rāzī, often known as (al-)Razi or by his Latin name Rhazes, also rendered Rhasis, was a Persian physician, philosopher and alchemist who lived during the Islamic Golden Age. He is widely regarded as one of the most important figures in the history of medicine, and also wrote on logic, astronomy and grammar. He is also known for his criticism of religion, especially with regard to the concepts of prophethood and revelation. However, the religio-philosophical aspects of his thought, which also included a belief in five "eternal principles", are only recorded by authors who were often hostile to him.

A comprehensive thinker, al-Razi made fundamental and enduring contributions to various fields, which he recorded in over 200 manuscripts, and is particularly remembered for numerous advances in medicine through his observations and discoveries. An early proponent of experimental medicine, he became a successful doctor, and served as chief physician of Baghdad and Ray hospitals. As a teacher of medicine, he attracted students of all backgrounds and interests and was said to be compassionate and devoted to the service of his patients, whether rich or poor. He was the first to clinically distinguish between smallpox and measles, and suggest sound treatment for the former.

Through translation, his medical works and ideas became known among medieval European practitioners and profoundly influenced medical education in the Latin West. Some volumes of his work Al-Mansuri, namely "On Surgery" and "A General Book on Therapy", became part of the medical curriculum in Western universities. Edward Granville Browne considers him as "probably the greatest and most original of all the Muslim physicians, and one of the most prolific as an author". Additionally, he has been described as the father of pediatrics, and a pioneer of obstetrics and ophthalmology. Notably, he became the first physician to recognize the reaction of the eye's pupil to light.

Biography

Al-Razi was born in the city of Ray (modern Rey, also the origin of his name "al-Razi"), into a family of Persian stock and was a native speaker of Persian language. Ray was situated on the Great Silk Road that for centuries facilitated trade and cultural exchanges between East and West. It is located on the southern slopes of the Alborz mountain range situated near Tehran, Iran.

In his youth, al-Razi moved to Baghdad where he studied and practiced at the local bimaristan (hospital). Later, he was invited back to Rey by Mansur ibn Ishaq, then the governor of Ray, and became a bimaristan's head. He dedicated two books on medicine to Mansur ibn Ishaq, The Spiritual Physic and Al-Mansūrī on Medicine. Because of his newly acquired popularity as physician, al-Razi was invited to Baghdad where he assumed the responsibilities of a director in a new hospital named after its founder al-Muʿtaḍid (d. 902 CE). Under the reign of Al-Mutadid's son, Al-Muktafi (r. 902-908) al-Razi was commissioned to build a new hospital, which should be the largest of the Abbasid Caliphate. To pick the future hospital's location, al-Razi adopted what is nowadays known as an evidence-based approach suggesting having fresh meat hung in various places throughout the city and to build the hospital where meat took longest to rot.

He spent the last years of his life in his native Rey suffering from glaucoma. His eye affliction started with cataracts and ended in total blindness. The cause of his blindness is uncertain. One account mentioned by Ibn Juljul attributed the cause to a blow to his head by his patron, Mansur ibn Ishaq, for failing to provide proof for his alchemy theories; while Abulfaraj and Casiri claimed that the cause was a diet of beans only. Allegedly, he was approached by a physician offering an ointment to cure his blindness. Al-Razi then asked him how many layers does the eye contain and when he was unable to receive an answer, he declined the treatment stating "my eyes will not be treated by one who does not know the basics of its anatomy".

The lectures of al-Razi attracted many students. As Ibn al-Nadim relates in Fihrist, al-Razi was considered a shaikh, an honorary title given to one entitled to teach and surrounded by several circles of students. When someone raised a question, it was passed on to students of the 'first circle'; if they did not know the answer, it was passed on to those of the 'second circle', and so on. When all students would fail to answer, al-Razi himself would consider the query. Al-Razi was a generous person by nature, with a considerate attitude towards his patients. He was charitable to the poor, treated them without payment in any form, and wrote for them a treatise Man La Yaḥḍuruhu al-Ṭabīb, or Who Has No Physician to Attend Him, with medical advice. One former pupil from Tabaristan came to look after him, but as al-Biruni wrote, al-Razi rewarded him for his intentions and sent him back home, proclaiming that his final days were approaching. According to Biruni, al-Razi died in Rey in 925 sixty years of age. Biruni, who considered al-Razi his mentor, among the first penned a short biography of al-Razi including a bibliography of his numerous works.

Ibn al-Nadim recorded an account by al-Razi of a Chinese student who copied down all of Galen's works in Chinese as al-Razi read them to him out loud after the student learned fluent Arabic in 5 months and attended al-Razi's lectures.

After his death, his fame spread beyond the Middle East to Medieval Europe, and lived on. In an undated catalog of the library at Peterborough Abbey, most likely from the 14th century, al-Razi is listed as a part author of ten books on medicine.

Contributions to medicine

Psychology and psychotherapy
Al-Razi was one of the world's first great medical experts. He is considered the father of psychology and psychotherapy.

Smallpox vs. measles
Al-Razi wrote:

Smallpox appears when blood "boils" and is infected, resulting in vapours being expelled. Thus juvenile blood (which looks like wet extracts appearing on the skin) is being transformed into richer blood, having the color of mature wine. At this stage, smallpox shows up essentially as "bubbles found in wine" (as blisters)... this disease can also occur at other times (meaning: not only during childhood). The best thing to do during this first stage is to keep away from it, otherwise this disease might turn into an epidemic.

This diagnosis is acknowledged by the Encyclopædia Britannica (1911), which states: "The most trustworthy statements as to the early existence of the disease are found in an account by the 9th-century Persian physician Rhazes, by whom its symptoms were clearly described, its pathology explained by a humoral or fermentation theory, and directions given for its treatment."

Al-Razi's book al-Judari wa al-Hasbah (On Smallpox and Measles) was the first book describing smallpox and measles as distinct diseases. It was translated more than a dozen times into Latin and other European languages. Its lack of dogmatism and its Hippocratic reliance on clinical observation show al-Razi's medical methods. For example, he wrote:The eruption of smallpox is preceded by a continued fever, pain in the back, itching in the nose and nightmares during sleep. These are the more acute symptoms of its approach together with a noticeable pain in the back accompanied by fever and an itching felt by the patient all over his body. A swelling of the face appears, which comes and goes, and one notices an overall inflammatory color noticeable as a strong redness on both cheeks and around both eyes. One experiences a heaviness of the whole body and great restlessness, which expresses itself as a lot of stretching and yawning. There is a pain in the throat and chest and one finds it difficult to breathe and cough. Additional symptoms are: dryness of breath, thick spittle, hoarseness of the voice, pain and heaviness of the head, restlessness, nausea and anxiety. (Note the difference: restlessness, nausea and anxiety occur more frequently with "measles" than with smallpox. At the other hand, pain in the back is more apparent with smallpox than with measles). Altogether one experiences heat over the whole body, one has an inflamed colon and one shows an overall shining redness, with a very pronounced redness of the gums. (Rhazes, Encyclopaedia of Medicine)

Meningitis 
Al-Razi compared the outcome of patients with meningitis treated with blood-letting with the outcome of those treated without it to see if blood-letting could help.

Pharmacy
Al-Razi contributed in many ways to the early practice of pharmacy by compiling texts, in which he introduces the use of "mercurial ointments" and his development of apparatus such as mortars, flasks, spatulas and phials, which were used in pharmacies until the early twentieth century.

Ethics of medicine
On a professional level, al-Razi introduced many practical, progressive, medical and psychological ideas. He attacked charlatans and fake doctors who roamed the cities and countryside selling their nostrums and "cures". At the same time, he warned that even highly educated doctors did not have the answers to all medical problems and could not cure all sicknesses or heal every disease, which was humanly speaking impossible. To become more useful in their services and truer to their calling, al-Razi advised practitioners to keep up with advanced knowledge by continually studying medical books and exposing themselves to new information. He made a distinction between curable and incurable diseases. Pertaining to the latter, he commented that in the case of advanced cases of cancer and leprosy the physician should not be blamed when he could not cure them. To add a humorous note, al-Razi felt great pity for physicians who took care for the well being of princes, nobility, and women, because they did not obey the doctor's orders to restrict their diet or get medical treatment, thus making it most difficult being their physician.

He also wrote the following on medical ethics:

Books and articles on medicine
Al-Kitab al Hawi
This 23-volume set medical textbooks contains the foundation of gynaecology, obstetrics and ophthalmic surgery

The Virtuous Life (al-Hawi الحاوي).

This monumental medical encyclopedia in nine volumes—known in Europe also as The Large Comprehensive or Continens Liber (جامع الكبير) ——contains considerations and criticism on the Greek philosophers Aristotle and Plato, and expresses innovative views on many subjects. Because of this book alone, many scholars consider al-Razi the greatest medical doctor of the Middle Ages.

The al-Hawi is not a formal medical encyclopedia, but a posthumous compilation of al-Razi's working notebooks, which included knowledge gathered from other books as well as original observations on diseases and therapies, based on his own clinical experience. It is significant since it contains a celebrated monograph on smallpox, the earliest one known. It was translated into Latin in 1279 by Faraj ben Salim, a physician of Sicilian-Jewish origin employed by Charles of Anjou, and after which it had a considerable influence in Europe.

The al-Hawi also criticized the views of Galen, after al-Razi had observed many clinical cases which did not follow Galen's descriptions of fevers. For example, he stated that Galen's descriptions of urinary ailments were inaccurate as he had only seen three cases, while al-Razi had studied hundreds of such cases in hospitals of Baghdad and Rey.

For One Who Has No Physician to Attend Him (Man la Yahduruhu Al-Tabib) (من لا يحضره الطبيب)—A medical adviser for the general public

Al-Razi was possibly the first Persian doctor to deliberately write a home medical manual (remedial) directed at the general public. He dedicated it to the poor, the traveller, and the ordinary citizen who could consult it for treatment of common ailments when a doctor was not available. This book is of special interest to the history of pharmacy since similar books were very popular until the 20th century. Al-Razi described in its 36 chapters, diets and drug components that can be found in either an apothecary, a market place, in well-equipped kitchens, or and in military camps. Thus, every intelligent person could follow its instructions and prepare the proper recipes with good results.

Some of the illnesses treated were headaches, colds, coughing, melancholy and diseases of the eye, ear, and stomach. For example, he prescribed for a feverish headache: " 2 parts of duhn (oily extract) of rose, to be mixed with 1 part of vinegar, in which a piece of linen cloth is dipped and compressed on the forehead". He recommended as a laxative, " 7 drams of dried violet flowers with 20 pears, macerated and well mixed, then strained. Add to this filtrate, 20 drams of sugar for a drink. In cases of melancholy, he invariably recommended prescriptions, which included either poppies or its juice (opium), Cuscuta epithymum (clover dodder) or both. For an eye-remedy, he advised myrrh, saffron, and frankincense, 2 drams each, to be mixed with 1 dram of yellow arsenic formed into tablets. Each tablet was to be dissolved in a sufficient quantity of coriander water and used as eye drops.

Book for al-Mansur
Al-Razi dedicated this work to his patron Abū Ṣāliḥ al-Manṣūr, the Samanid governor of Ray. A Latin translation of it was edited in the 16th century by the Dutch anatomist and physician Andreas Vesalius.

Doubts about Galen

In his book Doubts about Galen, al-Razi rejects several claims made by the Greek physician, as far as the alleged superiority of the Greek language and many of his cosmological and medical views. He links medicine with philosophy, and states that sound practice demands independent thinking. He reports that Galen's descriptions do not agree with his own clinical observations regarding the run of a fever. And in some cases he finds that his clinical experience exceeds Galen's.

He criticized Galen's theory that the body possessed four separate "humors" (liquid substances), whose balance are the key to health and a natural body-temperature. A sure way to upset such a system was to insert a liquid with a different temperature into the body resulting in an increase or decrease of bodily heat, which resembled the temperature of that particular fluid. Al-Razi noted that a warm drink would heat up the body to a degree much higher than its own natural temperature. Thus the drink would trigger a response from the body, rather than transferring only its own warmth or coldness to it. (Cf. I. E. Goodman)

This line of criticism essentially had the potential to completely refute Galen's theory of humors, as well as Aristotle's theory of the four elements, on which it was grounded. Al-Razi's own alchemical experiments suggested other qualities of matter, such as "oiliness" and "sulphurousness", or inflammability and salinity, which were not readily explained by the traditional fire, water, earth, and air division of elements.

Al-Razi's challenge to the current fundamentals of medical theory was quite controversial. Many accused him of ignorance and arrogance, even though he repeatedly expressed his praise and gratitude to Galen for his contributions and labours, saying:

I prayed to God to direct and lead me to the truth in writing this book. It grieves me to oppose and criticize the man Galen from whose sea of knowledge I have drawn much. Indeed, he is the Master and I am the disciple. Although this reverence and appreciation will and should not prevent me from doubting, as I did, what is erroneous in his theories. I imagine and feel deeply in my heart that Galen has chosen me to undertake this task, and if he were alive, he would have congratulated me on what I am doing. I say this because Galen's aim was to seek and find the truth and bring light out of darkness. I wish indeed he were alive to read what I have published.

The Diseases of Children

Al-Razi's The Diseases of Children was the first monograph to deal with pediatrics as an independent field of medicine.

Alchemy

The transmutation of metals
Al-Razi's interest in alchemy and his strong belief in the possibility of transmutation of lesser metals to silver and gold was attested half a century after his death by Ibn an-Nadim's book, The Philosopher's Stone (Lapis Philosophorum in Latin). Nadim attributed a series of twelve books to al-Razi, plus an additional seven, including his refutation to al-Kindi's denial of the validity of alchemy. Al-Kindi (801–873 CE) had been appointed by the Abbasid Caliph Ma'mun founder of Baghdad, to 'the House of Wisdom' in that city, he was a philosopher and an opponent of alchemy. Al-Razi's two best-known alchemical texts, which largely superseded his earlier ones: al-Asrar (الاسرار "The Secrets"), and Sirr al-Asrar (سر الاسرار "The Secret of Secrets"), which incorporates much of the previous work.

Apparently al-Razi's contemporaries believed that he had obtained the secret of turning iron and copper into gold. Biographer Khosro Moetazed reports in Mohammad Zakaria Razi that a certain General Simjur confronted al-Razi in public, and asked whether that was the underlying reason for his willingness to treat patients without a fee. "It appeared to those present that al-Razi was reluctant to answer; he looked sideways at the general and replied":I understand alchemy and I have been working on the characteristic properties of metals for an extended time. However, it still has not turned out to be evident to me, how one can transmute gold from copper. Despite the research from the ancient scientists done over the past centuries, there has been no answer. I very much doubt if it is possible...

Major works on alchemy

Al-Razi's works present the first systematic classification of carefully observed and verified facts regarding chemical substances, reactions and apparatus, described in a language almost entirely free from mysticism and ambiguity.

 The Secret
 This book was written in response to a request from al-Razi's close friend, colleague, and former student, Abu Muhammad ibn Yunis al-Bukhari, a Muslim mathematician, philosopher, and natural scientist.

 Secret of Secrets
 This is al-Razi's most famous book. Here he gives systematic attention to basic chemical operations important to the history of pharmacy.

 In his book , al-Razi divides the subject of "matter' into three categories, as in his previous book .
 Knowledge and identification of the medical components within substances derived from plants, animals, and minerals, and descriptions of the best types for medical treatments.
 Knowledge of equipment and tools of interest to and used by either alchemists or apothecaries.
 Knowledge of seven alchemical procedures and techniques: sublimation and condensation of mercury, precipitation of sulfur, and arsenic calcination of minerals (gold, silver, copper, lead, and iron), salts, glass, talc, shells, and waxing.

 This last category contains additional descriptions of other methods and applications used in transmutation:
 The added mixture and use of solvent vehicles.
 The amount of heat (fire) used, 'bodies and stones', ( and ) that can or cannot be transmuted into corporal substances such of metals and salts.
 The use of a liquid mordant which quickly and permanently colors lesser metals for more lucrative sale and profit.

 Similar to the commentary on the 8th century text on amalgams ascribed to Jabir ibn Hayyan, al-Razi gives methods and procedures of coloring a silver object to imitate gold (gold leafing) and the reverse technique of removing its color back to silver. Gilding and silvering of other metals (alum, calcium salts, iron, copper, and tutty) are also described, as well as how colors will last for years without tarnishing or changing.

 Al-Razi classified minerals into six divisions:
 Four spirits: mercury, sal ammoniac, sulphur, and arsenic sulphide (orpiment and realgar).
 Seven bodies: silver, gold, copper, iron, black lead, zinc, and tin.
 Thirteen stones: Marcasite, magnesia, malachite, tutty (zinc oxide), talcum, lapis lazuli, gypsum, azurite, haematite (iron oxide), arsenic oxide, mica, asbestos, and glass (then identified as made of sand and alkali of which the transparent crystal damascene is considered the best).
 Seven vitriols: alum, and white, black, red, and yellow vitriols (the impure sulfates of iron, copper, etc.), green.
 Seven borates: natron, and impure sodium borate.
 Eleven salts: including brine, common salt, ashes, naphtha, live lime, and urine, rock, and sea salts. Then he separately defines and describes each of these substances, the best forms and colours of each, and the qualities of various adulterations.

Al-Razi gives also a list of apparatus used in alchemy. This consists of 2 classes:
 Instruments used for the dissolving and melting of metals such as the blacksmith's hearth, bellows, crucible, thongs (tongue or ladle), stirring rod, cutter, grinder (pestle), file, shears, and semi-cylindrical iron mould.
 Utensils used to carry out the process of transmutation and various parts of the distilling apparatus: the retort, alembic, shallow iron pan, potters kiln and blowers, large oven, cylindrical stove, glass cups, flasks, phials, beakers, glass funnel, crucible, aludel, heating lamps, mortar, cauldron, hair-cloth, sand- and water-bath, sieve, flat stone mortar and chafing-dish.

Philosophy
Although al-Razi wrote extensively on philosophy, most of his works on this subject are now lost.

Metaphysics
Al-Razi's metaphysical doctrine derives from the theory of the "five eternals", according to which the world is produced out of an interaction between God and four other eternal principles (soul, matter, time, and place). He accepted a pre-socratic type of atomism of the bodies, and for that he differed from both the falasifa and the mutakallimun. While he was influenced by Plato and the medical writers, mainly Galen, he rejected taqlid and thus expressed criticism about some of their views. This is evident from the title of one of his works, Doubts About Galen.

Excerpt from The Philosophical Approach

Views on religion

A number of contradictory works and statements about religion have been ascribed to al-Razi. Many sources claim that al-Razi viewed prophecy and revealed religion as unnecessary and delusional, claiming that all humans have the ability to access and discover truth (including the existence of God) through God-given reason. According to these sources, his skepticism of prophecy and view that no one group or religion has privileged access to the truth is driven by his view that all people have an equal basic capacity for rationality and discovery of truth, and that apparent differences in this capacity are simply a feature of interest, opportunity, and effort.  Because of his supposed rejection of prophecy and acceptance of reason as the primary method for accessing the truth, al-Razi came to be admired as a freethinker by some.

According to al-Biruni's Bibliography of al-Razi (Risāla fī Fihrist Kutub al-Rāzī), al-Razi wrote two "heretical books": "Fī al-Nubuwwāt (On Prophecies) and "Fī Ḥiyal al-Mutanabbīn (On the Tricks of False Prophets). According to Biruni, the first "was claimed to be against religions" and the second "was claimed as attacking the necessity of the prophets." However, Biruni also listed some other works of al-Razi on religion, including Fi Wujub Da‘wat al-Nabi ‘Ala Man Nakara bi al-Nubuwwat (Obligation to Propagate the Teachings of the Prophet Against Those who Denied Prophecies) and Fi anna li al-Insan Khaliqan Mutqinan Hakiman (That Man has a Wise and Perfect Creator), listed under his works on the "divine sciences". None of his works on religion are now extant in full.

Sarah Stroumsa has argued that al-Razi was a freethinker who rejected all revealed religions. However, Peter Adamson holds that al-Razi did not reject revealed religion and was rather a believer in Islam, on the basis of more recent evidence. He states:It is worth noting that Stroumsa’s work predates Rashed’s discovery of this evidence in Fakhr al-Dīn, so that she did not have the benefit of being able to consider how this new information could be reconciled with the Proofs. That is the goal I will set for myself in this chapter. I should lay my cards on the table and say that I am persuaded by Rashed’s account, and do not believe that Razi was staging a general attack on prophecy or religion as Abū Ḥātim would have us think.

Debate with Abu Hatim 

The views and quotes that are often ascribed to al-Razi where he appears to be critical of religion are found in a book written by Abu Hatim al-Razi, called Aʿlām al-nubuwwa (Signs of Prophecy), which documents a debate between Abu Hatim and al-Razi. Abu Hatim was an Isma'ili missionary who debated al-Razi, but whether he has faithfully recorded the views of al-Razi is disputed. Some historians claim that Abu Hatim accurately represented al-Razi's scepticism of revealed religion while others argue that Abu Hatim's work should be treated with scepticism given that he is a hostile source of al-Razi's beliefs and might have portrayed him as a heretic to discount his critique of the Ismāʿīlīs.

According to Abdul Latif al-'Abd, Islamic philosophy professor at Cairo University, Abu Hatim and his student, Ḥamīd al-dīn Karmānī (d. after 411AH/1020CE), were Isma'ili extremists who often misrepresented the views of al-Razi in their works. This view is also corroborated by early historians like al-Shahrastani who noted "that such accusations should be doubted since they were made by Ismāʿīlīs, who had been severely attacked by Muḥammad ibn Zakariyyā Rāzī". Al-'Abd points out that the views allegedly expressed by al-Razi contradict what is found in al-Razi's own works, like the Spiritual Medicine (Fī al-ṭibb al-rūḥānī). Peter Adamson concurs that Abu Hatim may have "deliberately misdescribed" al-Razi's position as a rejection of Islam and revealed religions. Instead, al-Razi was only arguing against the use of miracles to prove Muhammad's prophecy, anthropomorphism, and the uncritical acceptance of taqlīd vs naẓar. Adamson points out to a work by Fakhr al-din al-Razi where al-Razi is quoted as citing the Quran and the prophets to support his views.

In contrast, earlier historians such as Paul Kraus and Sarah Stroumsa accepted that the extracts found in Abu Hatim's book were either said by al-Razi during a debate or were quoted from a now lost work. According to the debate with Abu Hatim, al-Razi denied the validity of prophecy or other authority figures, and rejected prophetic miracles. He also directed a scathing critique on revealed religions and the miraculous quality of the Quran. They suggest that this lost work is either his famous al-ʿIlm al-Ilāhī or another shorter independent work called Makharīq al-Anbiyāʾ (The Prophets' Fraudulent Tricks). Abu Hatim, however, did not explicitly mention al-Razi by name in his book, but referred to his interlocutor simply as the mulḥid (lit. "heretic").

Criticism
Al-Razi's religious and philosophical views were later criticized by Abu Rayhan Biruni and Avicenna in the early 11th century. Biruni in particular wrote a short treatise (risala) dealing with al-Razi, criticizing him for his sympathy with Manichaeism, his Hermetical writings, his religious and philosophical views, for refusing to mathematize physics, and his active opposition to mathematics. Avicenna, who was himself a physician and philosopher, also criticized al-Razi. During a debate with Biruni, Avicenna stated:

Nasr-i-Khosraw posthumously accused him of having plagiarized Iranshahri, whom Khosraw considered the master of al-Razi.

Legacy

The modern-day Razi Institute in Karaj and Razi University in Kermanshah were named after him. A "Razi Day" ("Pharmacy Day") is commemorated in Iran every 27 August.

In June 2009, Iran donated a "Scholars Pavilion" or Chartagi to the United Nations Office in Vienna, now placed in the central Memorial Plaza of the Vienna International Center. The pavilion features the statues of al-Razi, Avicenna, Abu Rayhan Biruni, and Omar Khayyam.

George Sarton remarked him as "greatest physician of Islam and the Medieval Ages".

While The Bulletin of the World Health Organization (May 1970) noted that his "writings on smallpox and measles show originality and accuracy, and his essay on infectious diseases was the first scientific treatise on the subject".

See also

References

Notes

Citations

Sources

Further reading

Primary literature

By al-Razi

 
 Brockelmann, Carl. Geschichte der arabischen Litteratur, I, pp. 268–71 (second edition), Suppl., Vol. I, pp. 418–21. (overview of extant manuscripts of al-Razi's works)
 Butterworth, Charles E., "The Book of the Philosophic Life". Interpretation: A Journal of Political Philosophy.
Goharshad 953)
Review in 
  (critical edition and French translation of )
  (edition of extant philosophical works)
  (German translation of the )
  (English translation of Ruska 1937's translation of the Arabic)

By others
 Ibn Al-Nadim, Fihrist, (ed. Flugel), pp. 299 et sqq.
 Translated in 
 Sa'id al-Andalusi, Tabaqat al-Umam, p. 33
 Ibn Juljul, Tabaqat al-Atibba w-al-Hukama, (ed. Fu'ad Sayyid), Cairo, 1355/1936, pp. 77–78
 J. Ruska, Al-Biruni als Quelle fur das Leben und die Schriften al-Razi's, Isis, Vol. V, 1924, pp. 26–50.
 Al-Biruni, Epitre de Beruni, contenant le repertoire des ouvres de Muhammad ibn Zakariya ar-Razi, publiee par P. Kraus, Paris, 1936
 Al-Baihaqi, Tatimmah Siwan al-Hikma, (ed. M. Ghafi), Lahore, 1351/1932
 Al-Qifti,Tarikh al-Hukama, (ed. Lippert), pp. 27–177
 Ibn Abi Usaibi'ah,Uyun al-Anba fi Tabaqat al-Atibba, Vol. I, pp. 309–21
 Abu Al-Faraj ibn al-'Ibri (Bar-Hebraeus),Mukhtasar Tarikh al-Duwal, (ed. A. Salhani), p. 291
 Ibn Khallikan, Wafayat al-A'yan, (ed. Muhyi al-Din 'Abd al-Hamid), Cairo, 1948, No. 678, pp. 244–47
 Al-Safadi, Nakt al-Himyan, pp. 249–50
 Ibn al-'Imad, Shadharat al-Dhahab, Vol. II, p. 263
 Al-'Umari, Masalik al-Absar, Vol. V, Part 2, ff. 301-03 (photostat copy in Dar al-Kutub al-Misriyyah).

Secondary literature

 Badawi, Abdurrahman, Min Tarlkh al-Ilhad fi al-Islam Islamica, Vol. II, Cairo, 1945, pp. 198–228.

 Eisen, A. Kimiya al-Razi, RAAD, DIB, 62/4.

 
 Hirschberg,Geschichte der Augenheilkunde, p. 101.
 
 Leclerc, Lucien (1876). Histoire de la medicine arabe, Paris, Vol. I, pp. 337–54.
 Meyerhof, M. Legacy of Islam, pp. 323 et seq.
 Mieli, Aldo (1938). La science arabe, Leiden, 1938, pp. 8, 16.
  (a survey of all Latin alchemical texts attributed to authors writing in Arabic, including Latin texts attributed to al-Razi)
 
 
 Pines, S. Die Atomenlehre ar-Razi's in Beitrage zur islamischen Atomenlehre, Berlin, 1936, pp. 34–93.
 
 Ranking, G. S. A. (1913). The Life and Works of Rhazes, in Proceedings of the Seventeenth International Congress of Medicine, London, pp. 237–68.
 Renaud, H. P. J. (1931). A propos du millenaire de Razes, in bulletin de la Societe Irancaise d'Histoire de la medicine, Mars-avril, pp. 203 et seq.
 Rockey, Denyse and Johnstone, Penelope (1979). "Medieval Arabic views on speech disorders: Al-Razi (c. 865–925)", in: Journal of Communication Disorders, 12(3):229-43.
 
 
 
  (argues that most Latin texts attributed to al-Razi are pseudepigraphs)
  (contains a comparison of Jabir ibn Hayyan's and Abu Bakr al-Razi's knowledge of chemical apparatus, processes and substances)
 Shader, H. H., ZDMG, 79, pp. 228–35 (see translation into Arabic by Abdurrahman Badawi in al-Insan al-Kamil, Islamica, Vol. XI, Cairo, 1950, pp. 37–44).
  (contains an in-depth analysis of the )
 
 Von Lippmann, E. O.  Entstehung und Ausbreitung der Alchemie, Vol. II, p. 181.
 Wüstenfeld, F., Geschichte der Arabischen Arzte und Naturforscher, ftn. 98.

External links

 
 "al-Razi" on Islamic Philosophy Online, encyclopedia article about al-Razi by Paul E. Walker.
 Lives of the Physicians, dating from 1882, features a biography, in Arabic, about Rhazes.

 
864 births
865 births
925 deaths
935 deaths
9th-century Iranian physicians
10th-century Iranian physicians
9th-century Iranian philosophers
10th-century Iranian philosophers
Alchemists of the medieval Islamic world
Inventors of the medieval Islamic world
Iranian inventors
Pharmacologists of medieval Iran
People from Ray, Iran
Samanid scholars
Critics of religions
Iranian psychologists
Iranian ethicists
9th-century inventors
Psychology in the medieval Islamic world